Richard Allen "Rick" DeHart (born March 21, 1970) is a former left-handed pitcher in Major League Baseball. He played for the Montreal Expos and Kansas City Royals.  He was the pitching coach for the Kansas City T-Bones. He is now a Recreational Supervisor at KJCC Kansas Juvenile Correction Complex

External links

1970 births
Living people
Albany Polecats players
American expatriate baseball players in Canada
American expatriate baseball players in Japan
American expatriate baseball players in Mexico
Baseball coaches from Kansas
Baseball players from Kansas
Harrisburg Senators players
Hiroshima Toyo Carp players
Kansas City Royals players
Kansas City T-Bones players
Major League Baseball pitchers
Montreal Expos players
Nippon Professional Baseball pitchers
Omaha Royals players
Ottawa Lynx players
San Bernardino Spirit players
Schaumburg Flyers players
Sportspeople from Topeka, Kansas
St. Joe Blacksnakes players
Sultanes de Monterrey players
Washburn Ichabods baseball players
West Palm Beach Expos players
Wichita Wranglers players
Wilmington Blue Rocks players